William Duncan Cowan (9 August 1896 – unknown) was a Scottish professional footballer. An inside right who could also play at inside left, he played in the Football League for Newcastle United, Manchester City, Hartlepool United and Darlington.

Cowan also received one cap for Scotland, scoring his team's goal in a 1–1 draw with England in 1924

References

1896 births
Year of death missing
Footballers from Edinburgh
Scottish footballers
Dundee F.C. players
Newcastle United F.C. players
St Mirren F.C. players
Manchester City F.C. players
North Shields F.C. players
Hartlepool United F.C. players
Darlington F.C. players
Scotland international footballers
English Football League players
Scottish Football League players
Association football forwards
Tranent Juniors F.C. players
Place of death missing
FA Cup Final players